George Katrib is an Australian former rugby league footballer who represented Lebanon at the 2000 Rugby League World Cup.

Background
Katrib was born in Sydney, New South Wales, Australia.

Playing career
From the Sydney Bulls, Katrib was selected for Lebanon's 2000 World Cup squad. He started the first match at centre and was one of three players requiring medical treatment for hypothermia after the match due to the poor weather in Gloucester. He missed the second match due to a knee injury, playing in the third match from the bench.

References

Australian rugby league players
Australian people of Lebanese descent
Lebanon national rugby league team players
Rugby league centres
Sydney Bulls players
Place of birth missing (living people)
Year of birth missing (living people)
Living people